Franklin High School is a public high school in Franklin, Virginia. It is a co-educational school serving grades 9-12.  Franklin High School is a member of the Tri-Rivers District, Class A athletic conference. Franklin High School is part of the Franklin City Public Schools District.

History
In 1990, the school was one of 15 high schools nationally to be honored by the White House for its efforts to reduce or eliminate teen tobacco and drug usage.  As part of the honor, FHS principal, Sam Jones, went to the White House to meet the president.

Up until 2003, the school's senior class had a tradition of writing goodbye messages and college information on a barn across from FHS.  The "Senior Wall" came down, with the assistance of FHS alumni, in December 2003.

Athletics
Franklin High School is a member of the Tri-Rivers District, Class A athletic conference.  The following sports are offered:

Football
Volleyball
Golf
Basketball (boys and girls)
Wrestling
Baseball
Softball
Tennis (boys and girls)
Cross country
Track
Soccer (boys and girls)

State championships
In the year 2004, the school's varsity football team won the state championship over J.I. Burton High School.
In 2008 the Broncos won their second State Championship in four years against Clintwood 28-20.
in total franklin high has 6 state champions as a school in football, basketball, volleyball, and gymnastics started in the 1980s

References

External links

Public high schools in Virginia
Schools in Franklin, Virginia